The Menard Press is a small-press independent publisher founded by Anthony Rudolf. It started as a magazine in 1969 and put out its first book in 1971. Today Menard Press is an imprint run by publisher Elte Rauch. 

The Menard Press has specialised in literary translation, mainly of poetry. In addition to literary texts – original and translated poetry, original and translated fiction, non-fiction, art and literary criticism – the press has published essays on the nuclear issue (by Sir Martin Ryle and Lord Zuckerman, among others) as well as works and testimonies by survivors of Nazism, including the first English edition of Primo Levi's poems.

In 2007 it announced it would be publishing its last book, but would continue to be engaged in the literary and cultural realm.

From 2021 on, The Menard Press resumes its publishing work under the passionate involvement of Elte Rauch, who lives and works between the Netherlands and the United Kingdom. In Amsterdam, she runs the independent publishing house HetMoet.

She continues in Rudolf's legacy and adds feminism, science, internationalism and social justice to Menard’s portfolio. Elte aims to sustainably reissue out-of-print titles as well as to offer new and contemporary publications at Menard Press to a growing and variable audience, in both the United Kingdom and the Netherlands.

The first publication of the imprint Menard Press since its revival has been On Being Ill, an anthology created during the COVID-19 pandemic with the collaboration of authors and editors around the world in times of lockdown. Among the authors are classics such as Virginia Woolf and Audre Lorde, as well as contemporary writers Nadia de Vries, Deryn-Rees Jones, Lieke Marsman, Jameisha Prescod, Sinéad Gleeson, Nafissa Thompson-Spires and Mieke van Zonneveld.

Menard Press Web site
https://www.hetmoet.com/menardpress
https://inpressbooks.co.uk/collections/menard-press-1

Small press publishing companies
Book publishing companies of the United Kingdom
Publishing companies established in 1969